FLOW-MATIC, originally known as B-0 (Business Language version 0), was the first English-like data processing language. It was developed for the UNIVAC I at Remington Rand under Grace Hopper from 1955 to 1959, and helped shape the development of COBOL.

Development 
Hopper had found that business data processing customers were uncomfortable with mathematical notation:
 In late 1953, she proposed that data processing problems should be expressed using English keywords, but Rand management considered the idea unfeasible. In early 1955, she and her team wrote a specification for such a programming language and implemented a prototype. The FLOW-MATIC compiler became publicly available in early 1958 and was substantially complete in 1959.

Innovations and influence 
The Laning and Zierler system was the first programming language to parse algebraic formulae. When Hopper became aware of that language in 1954, it altered the trajectory of her work. FLOW-MATIC was the first programming language to express operations using English-like statements. It was also the first system to distinctly separate the description of data from the operations on it. Its data definition language, unlike its executable statements, was not English-like; rather, data structures were defined by filling in pre-printed forms.

FLOW-MATIC  and its direct descendant AIMACO shaped COBOL, which incorporated several of its elements:

 Defining Input & Output Files and printed output in advance, separated into INPUT files, OUTPUT files and (HSP) High Speed Printer outputs. ; ;  .
 Qualification of data-names ( or  clause).
  clause on file  operations.
 Figurative constant  (originally , where number of s indicated precision).
 Dividing the program into sections, separating different parts of the program.

Sample program 
A sample FLOW-MATIC program:

   INPUT INVENTORY FILE-A PRICE FILE-B ; OUTPUT PRICED-INV FILE-C UNPRICED-INV
      FILE-D ; HSP D .
   COMPARE PRODUCT-NO (A) WITH PRODUCT-NO (B) ; IF GREATER GO TO OPERATION 10 ;
      IF EQUAL GO TO OPERATION 5 ; OTHERWISE GO TO OPERATION 2 .
   TRANSFER A TO D .
   WRITE-ITEM D .
   JUMP TO OPERATION 8 .
   TRANSFER A TO C .
   MOVE UNIT-PRICE (B) TO UNIT-PRICE (C) .
   WRITE-ITEM C .
   READ-ITEM A ; IF END OF DATA GO TO OPERATION 14 .
   JUMP TO OPERATION 1 .
  READ-ITEM B ; IF END OF DATA GO TO OPERATION 12 .
  JUMP TO OPERATION 1 .
  SET OPERATION 9 TO GO TO OPERATION 2 .
  JUMP TO OPERATION 2 .
  TEST PRODUCT-NO (B) AGAINST ; IF EQUAL GO TO OPERATION 16 ;
      OTHERWISE GO TO OPERATION 15 .
  REWIND B .
  CLOSE-OUT FILES C ; D .
  STOP . (END)

Sample Notes
 Note that this sample includes only the executable statements of the program, the  section. The record fields  and  would have been defined in the  section, which (as previously noted) did not use English-like syntax.
 Files are referred to by the letter at the end of the FILE-LETTER. Example: FILE-A is referred to later just by A and is for ease of reference in following code. 
 Operations are numbered in an unbroken sequence from 0..n and are performed in that order unless a statement to the contrary is reached/made (executed) (JUMP, etc.).
 The highest numbered operation is the one that stops the program.
 A much more detailed overview of FLOW-MATIC is available in the manual entitled, FLOW-MATIC PROGRAMMING SYSTEM

Notes

References 

 Hopper, Grace (1978). Keynote Address, History of Programming Languages I. ACM. pp. 16–20. 
 Hopper, Grace (1959). “Automatic programming: Present status and future trends”, Mechanisation of Thought Processes, National Physical Laboratory Symposium 10. Her Majesty's Stationery Office. pp 155–200, cited in 
 Sammet, Jean (1969). Programming Languages: History and Fundamentals. Prentice-Hall. p. 316–324. 
 Sammet, Jean (1978). "The Early History of COBOL", History of Programming Languages I. ACM. pp. 199–243. 
 Sperry Rand Corporation (1957) Introducing a New Language for Automatic Programming: Univac Flow-Matic
 Remington Rand Univac a Division of Sperry Rand Corporation (1957). FLOW-MATIC PROGRAMMING SYSTEMFLOW-MATIC_Programming_System_1958.pdf

Procedural programming languages
COBOL
Programming languages created in 1955